USS LST-492 was an  built for the United States Navy during World War II. Like many of her class, she was not named and is properly referred to by her hull designation.

Construction and commissioning
LST-492 was laid down on 3 August 1943, at Evansville, Indiana, by the Missouri Valley Bridge & Iron Company; launched on 30 September 1943; sponsored by Mrs. John A. Spruill; and commissioned on 8 December 1943.

Service history
During World War II, LST-492 was assigned to the European Theater and participated in the Invasion of Normandy in June 1944, and the invasion of southern France in August and September 1944. She was then assigned to the Asiatic-Pacific Theater and took part in the assault and occupation of Okinawa Gunto in May and June 1945.

Following the war, LST-492 performed occupation duty in the Far East until December 1945. She returned to the United States and was decommissioned on 17 June 1946, and struck from the Navy list on 23 June 1947.

On 24 February 1948, the LST-492 was sold to Green's Bayou Transporters, Houston, Texas, for non-self-propelled operation.

Honors and awards
LST-492 earned three battle stars for World War II service.

References

Bibliography

See also
 List of United States Navy LSTs

LST-491-class tank landing ships
World War II amphibious warfare vessels of the United States
Cold War amphibious warfare vessels of the United States
Ships built in Evansville, Indiana
1943 ships